The Darkening Green is a 1934 novel by the British writer Compton Mackenzie.

References

Bibliography
 David Joseph Dooley. Compton Mackenzie. Twayne Publishers, 1974.

1934 British novels
Novels by Compton Mackenzie
Novels set in England
Cassell (publisher) books
Doubleday, Doran books